

List of Ambassadors

Aliza Bin-Noun 
Yossi Gal 2010-2015

Former Heads of Mission
Consul General Benad Avital (Non-Resident, Marseille) 1979 - 1982
Consul General Shimon Avimor (Non-Resident, Marseille) 1976 - 1979

References

Monaco
Israel